Drewonde Bascome (born 17 November 1992) is Bermudan footballer who currently plays for Robin Hood FC and the Bermuda national football team as a midfielder.

Personal life
Drewonde Bascome is the cousin of Osagi Bascome, who was also an international footballer with Bermuda.

International career
Bascome has represented his team at various youth levels and in one instance captained the u-20 team and scored a stoppage time winner against Saint Kitts and Nevis that earned him the man-of-the-match award.

References 

1992 births
Living people
Bermudian footballers
Bermuda international footballers
Association football midfielders